Living in the Heart of the Beast was, in 1985, the second full-length album by the Kalahari Surfers, the recording identity of South African musician Warrick Sony. The album title was taken from the title of a Tim Hodgkinson composition, "Living in the Heart of the Beast" on the Henry Cow album In Praise of Learning. Jon Savage wrote in the New Statesman that it was a "success", praised its "viciously critical (and historically intelligent) lyrics", and compared it with early Zappa. The NME called it "brave".

Track listing
 "Grensvegter" – 06:24
 "Europeans" – 04:35
 "Safety Seat" – 04:08
 "1999" – 03:59
 "Township Beat" – 05:22
 "Zola and the Budget" – 02:28
 "Song for Magnus" – 03:05
 "Reasonable Men" – 04:11
 "Play It Backwards" – 03:42

References

External links
Official site

1985 albums
Kalahari Surfers albums